VPD may refer to:

Science and technology
 Vaccine-preventable diseases
 Vapour phase decomposition, a method used in the semiconductor industry
 Vapour-pressure deficit, a measure of the difference between air humidity and saturation

Computing
 Virtual private database, masks data in a larger database
 Virtual product development, developing and prototyping products in a completely digital 2D/3D environment
 Vital Product Data, in computer hardware or in AIX Object Data Manager terminology

Other uses
 Vancouver Police Department